Mother Love may refer to:

 Mother Love (entertainer), an American entertainer
 "Mother Love" (song), a song by the British rock band Queen
 Mother Love (TV series), a British television drama
 Mother Love (1916 film), a British silent film
 Mother Love (1938 film), a French comedy drama film
 Mother Love (1939 film), a German drama film